Geraldines are a GAA club from Haggardstown, County Louth, and Blackrock, County Louth, Ireland. The club fields Gaelic football teams in competitions organized by Louth GAA.

History
The club was founded in 1904 and was originally known as Dundalk Geraldines.

Achievements
 Louth Senior Football Championship Winners (5) 1913, 1915, 1916, 1920, 1982
 Leinster Intermediate Club Football Championship Winners 2013
 Louth Intermediate Football Championship Winners (5) 1912, 1979, 1995, 2005, 2013
 Louth Junior Football Championship Winners (4) 1909, 1920, 1939, 1966
 Louth Minor Football Championship Winners (4) 1995, 2007, 2008, 2013
 Louth Under-21 Football Championship Winners (5) 1975, 1983, 2009, 2011, 2012

References

External links
 Former Geraldines website
 Newer Geraldines website

Gaelic games clubs in County Louth
Gaelic football clubs in County Louth